Languedoc is a former province of France. 

Languedoc may also refer to:

Places
 Languedoc-Roussillon, a former administrative region of France
 Languedoc, Western Cape, a settlement in South Africa

People
 François Languedoc (1790-1840), Canadian businessman and politician
 Henri Languedoc (1885-1917), French 1st World War aviator
 Paul Languedoc, rock music sound engineer and guitar maker

Ships
 French ship Languedoc (1766), a naval ship-of-the-line
 French battleship Languedoc, an uncompleted Normandie-class ship, launched in 1916
 Languedoc (2014), a French FREMM multipurpose frigate
 MV Languedoc, a French oil tanker built in 1937 and lost in 1940

Other
 Languedoc (grape), an alternative name for the German/Italian Trollinger variety
 Languedoc-Roussillon wine, produced in those parts of the Occitanie region
 Languedoc, an alternative name for the French Mondeuse noire grape variety
 Langue d'oc, French name for the Occitan language
 Régiment de Languedoc, an 18th-century French Army regiment
 SNCASE Languedoc (SE.161), a French passenger aircraft built in the 1940s

See also
 Languedocien dialect, an Occitan dialect spoken in rural parts of southern France